Éric Doligé (born 25 May 1943 in Paris) is a French politician and former member of the Senate of France. He represented the Loiret department and is a member of The Republicans Party.

References
Page on the Senate website

1943 births
Living people
Politicians from Paris
Rally for the Republic politicians
Union for a Popular Movement politicians
The Republicans (France) politicians
The Strong Right
Deputies of the 9th National Assembly of the French Fifth Republic
Deputies of the 10th National Assembly of the French Fifth Republic
Deputies of the 11th National Assembly of the French Fifth Republic
French Senators of the Fifth Republic
Senators of Loiret